Stacy is a city in Chisago County, Minnesota, United States, along the Sunrise River.  The population was 1,456 at the 2010 census.

Interstate 35 serves as a main route for the community.

History
A post office called Stacy has been in operation since 1873. Stacy was laid out in 1875, and named for Dr. Stacy B. Collins, an early settler.

Geography

Demographics

2010 census
As of the census of 2010, there were 1,456 people, 548 households, and 379 families living in the city. The racial makeup of the city was 94.4% White, 0.8% African American, 0.3% Native American, 1.4% Asian, 0.1% Pacific Islander, 0.5% from other races, and 2.4% from two or more races. Hispanic or Latino of any race were 1.7% of the population.

There were 548 households, of which 39.8% had children under the age of 18 living with them, 46.9% were married couples living together, 12.6% had a female householder with no husband present, 9.7% had a male householder with no wife present, and 30.8% were non-families. 23.5% of all households were made up of individuals, and 9.1% had someone living alone who was 65 years of age or older. The average household size was 2.66 and the average family size was 3.08.

The median age in the city was 33.4 years. 27.3% of residents were under the age of 18; 7% were between the ages of 18 and 24; 32.4% were from 25 to 44; 24.6% were from 45 to 64; and 8.7% were 65 years of age or older. The gender makeup of the city was 52.7% male and 47.3% female.

2000 census
At the 2000 census, there were 1,278 people, 466 households and 326 families living in the city. The racial makeup of the city was 96.79% White, 0.55% African American, 1.25% Native American, 0.16% Asian, 0.16% from other races, and 1.10% from two or more races. Hispanic or Latino of any race were 0.94% of the population.
 
There were 466 households, of which 42.1% had children under the age of 18 living with them, 48.9% were married couples living together, 13.5% had a female householder with no husband present, and 30.0% were non-families. 22.5% of all households were made up of individuals, and 5.2% had someone living alone who was 65 years of age or older. The average household size was 2.74 and the average family size was 3.23.

Age distribution was 32.6% under the age of 18, 9.3% from 18 to 24, 36.9% from 25 to 44, 16.0% from 45 to 64, and 5.2% who were 65 years of age or older. The median age was 29 years. For every 100 females, there were 109.2 males. For every 100 females age 18 and over, there were 108.2 males.

The median household income was $42,026, and the median family income was $45,288. Males had a median income of $36,029 versus $25,192 for females. The per capita income for the city was $16,893. About 7.9% of families and 9.4% of the population were below the poverty line, including 12.5% of those under age 18 and 11.8% of those age 65 or over.

Notable people
 Jessica Dereschuk – beauty queen, who has competed in the Miss USA pageant, also winner of the Miss Minnesota USA 2004 pageant.  Hails from Stacy.
 Hunter Miska - ice hockey goaltender currently playing for the Colorado Avalanche.

References

Cities in Chisago County, Minnesota
Cities in Minnesota